Ditylenchus angustus (Rice stem nematode) is a plant pathogenic nematode.

References

External links 
 Nemaplex, University of California - Ditylenchus angustus 

Tylenchida
Agricultural pest nematodes
Rice diseases